Dmytro Kotsiubailo (nickname Da Vinci; 1 November 1995 – 7 March 2023) was a Ukrainian volunteer, soldier, junior lieutenant, a commander of the 1st Mechanized Battalion of the Armed Forces of Ukraine. He was a participant in the Russo-Ukrainian War. Kotsiubailo was the youngest battalion commander in the history of the Ukrainian Army. He served as a leader of the right-wing Right Sector movement.

In December 2021 President Volodymyr Zelenskyy awarded Kotsiubailo the Hero of Ukraine Ukraine decoration, the country's highest honour. In 2022, he was included in the 30 under 30: Faces of the Future rating by Forbes.

Early life 

Dmytro Kotsiubailo was born on 1 November 1995 in the village of Zadnistrianske, now Burshtyn community, Ivano-Frankivsk Raion, Ivano-Frankivsk Oblast, Ukraine. He graduated from Bovshivka Secondary School and Ivano-Frankivsk Art Lyceum.

He was an active participant of the Revolution of Dignity. Participant of the Russo-Ukrainian War, in particular, a platoon commander of volunteers (2014) and a company (2015). In 2014, he was wounded in Pisky, Donetsk Oblast, and returned to the front after recovery. On 17 March 2016, he had served as a captain of an ultra-nationalist volunteer battalion known as the “Right Sector" and led the 1st Mechanized Battalion "Da Vinci Wolves", but never joined the Armed Forces of Ukraine.

Death 

On 7 March 2023, Kotsiubailo was killed. President Volodymyr Zelenskyy said in his video address: "Today, 'Da Vinci', a Hero of Ukraine, a volunteer, a man-symbol, a man of courage, Dmytro Kotsiubailo, was killed in action. A fighter of the 67th separate mechanized brigade, a commander. He died in the battle near Bakhmut, in the battle for Ukraine".

Awards 

the title of Hero of Ukraine with the Order of the Golden Star (30 November 2021) — for personal courage in the defense of state sovereignty and territorial integrity of Ukraine;

Order of the People's Hero of Ukraine (2017).

References 

1995 births
2023 deaths
People from Ivano-Frankivsk Oblast
Ukrainian military personnel killed in the 2022 Russian invasion of Ukraine
Recipients of the Order of Gold Star (Ukraine)
Ukrainian military personnel of the Russo-Ukrainian War